Jibjat is a village in Taqah Province, Dhofar Governorate, in southwestern Oman.

See also 
 Dhofar Mountains

References

External links 

Populated places in the Dhofar Governorate